PXA may refer to:
 Pecotox Air, a Moldovan airline
 Phomoxanthone A, a mycotoxin that affects the mitochondria
 Pleomorphic xanthoastrocytoma, a type of brain tumour
 PXA, a processor family based on the XScale microarchitecture
 Atung Bungsu Airport IATA code